The Central District of Kowsar County is in Ardabil province, Iran. At the 2006 census, its population was 20,674 in 4,619 households. The following census in 2011 counted 20,013 people in 5,319 households. At the latest census in 2016, the district had 17,499 inhabitants living in 5,197 households.

References 

Kowsar County

Districts of Ardabil Province

Populated places in Ardabil Province

Populated places in Kowsar County